Josh Sullivan may refer to:
 Josh Sullivan (baseball)
 Josh Sullivan (cricketer)